Barry and Sally Childs-Helton are a husband-and-wife duo of filk performers based in Indianapolis, IN. Barry is an accomplished guitarist and prolific songwriter, while Sally is a creative percussionist (as well as a certified Music for People improvisation teacher ). Their eclectic repertoire ranges from clever parodies to lyrically dense "space music," mining diverse musical genres including folk, blues, rock and jazz. Both Barry and Sally have doctorate degrees in folklore from Indiana University, and the title of their album Paradox is an intentional pun. (However, Sally's song Alphabet Soup can be read as her commentary on academia.) They are legacy members of The Black Book Band (active 1990–1998) and current members of Wild Mercy (2002-present). Together they have been nominated 21 times for the Pegasus Award given by the Ohio Valley Filk Fest, collecting 5 trophies. In 2003, they were inducted into the Filk Hall of Fame.

Discography
 Escape from Mundania 1987, Space Opera House - cassette
 Paradox 1989, Space Opera House - cassette
 First Contact 1995, Dodeka Records (with Black Book Band) - cassette 
 First Contact 1997, Dodeka Records (with Black Book Band) - CD with bonus tracks
 Tempus Fugitives 2001, Dodeka Records - CD compilation of selected tracks from Escape from Mundania and Paradox
 Summer Storm 2003, Small Green Alien Productions (with Wild Mercy)  - CD
 Furious Fancies 2005, Small Green Alien Productions (with Wild Mercy) - CD
 Dream of a Far Light 2008, Small Green Alien Productions (with WIld Mercy) - CD
 The Summers Behind You 2015, Dragon Scale Studios (Barry solo) - CD

Pegasus Awards
1988 Best Performer
1993 (Barry) Best Space Song (Lightsailor)
1994 (w/ Black Book Band) Best Performer
2012 (w/ Wild Mercy) Best Performer
2016 (Barry) Best Writer/Composer

Pegasus Nominations (individually and jointly)
 Best Writer/Composer - 1988, 1990, 1991, 1993, 2008, 2010, 2011, 2015
 Best Performer - 1991, 1993, 2008, 2009
 Best Genre Crossover - 1992, 1993
 Best Fannish Song - 1990
 Best Love Song - 1991
 Best End of the World Song - 2000
 Best Risque Song - 1994
 Best Filk Song - 2010
 Best Classic Filk Song - 2016, 2017

References

American musical duos
Filkers
Living people
Indiana University alumni
Musicians from Indiana
Male–female musical duos
Married couples
Songwriters from Indiana
Year of birth missing (living people)